Dortmund-Wickede West is a railway station in the Dortmund district of Wickede in the German state of North Rhine-Westphalia. It is classified by Deutsche Bahn as a category 6 station. It was opened on 15 May 1876 on the Welver–Sterkrade railway completed between Welver and the old Dortmund Süd (south) station by the Royal Westphalian Railway Company on the same date and electrified on 25 May 1984. It was originally called Wickede-Asseln, but it was renamed Dortmund-Asseln between 1927 and 1930 and Dortmund-Wickede West on 3 June 1984.

It is served by Rhine-Ruhr S-Bahn line S 4 at 30-minute intervals (15-minute intervals in the peak between Dortmund-Lütgendortmund and ).

The station is also served by bus route 428 (Baedekerstr + Roningweg) of the municipal bus company, Dortmunder Stadtwerke (DSW21) at 20-minute intervals.

References 

S4 (Rhine-Ruhr S-Bahn)
Rhine-Ruhr S-Bahn stations
Railway stations in Dortmund
Railway stations in Germany opened in 1876